The first ever children parliament of its kind was launched on Friday 14 November 2008 by Society for the Protection of the Rights of Child (SPARC) to raise awareness and promote child rights in Pakistan.
  
The members are elected from different schools of Islamabad, Peshawar, Faisalabad, Mithi, Kohlu, Balakot, Karachi and Lahore etc. All the members of national assembly are elected for duration of one year at a time.

Objectives 

The basic objectives of Children Parliament of Pakistan (CPP) is to provide the rights to every child of Pakistan and to:  
 
 End child labor 
 Educate every child
 Provide medical facilities to children
 Protect the children

In addition Children Parliament serves as a voice of children to convey the problems and difficulties faced by the children of Pakistan to government.

Members

Year 2008-2009 
Session 2008-2009 had 34 members some of which are: 

Bakht Jamshaid (Speaker Cpp and present SG)
Muhammad Umar iqbal (PM)
Saad Bashir (Chairman)
Komal Rizwan (Law Minister)
Muhammad Abbas Khan Niazi (Health Minister)
Mashal (Education Minister)
Tallha Rizwan (Present PM)
Bakhtawar Jabeen (Opposition Leader)
Abbas Jamal
Zain Abidiswkmk f kfkfidueiznsuidnjrk
Gixdnenekmdl 
Voddjrk
Fhrj mr
Ali Khalid
Zainab 
Ibrahim Niazi
Nelaish Kumar
Syed Amna Zubia
Pershant Sharma (Child labor minister)

Year 2010-2011 
Muhammad Umar Saleem (MNA) party APP
Shaikh Muhammad Hassan Ali (Minister of Anti-Narcotics) party APP
Mahnoor Hassan (Opposition Leader) party PCAP
Muhammad Saif Jamshed Baryar (Speaker) party APP
Talha Bin Rizwan (Prime Minister) party APP
Sharjeel Larik (Law Minister) party APP
៛ AAMIR ALI SILRO (DEPUTY SPEAKER, LARKANA SESSION 2010-2011)

References

Children's rights organizations
Child-related organisations in Pakistan
Organizations established in 2008
Youth councils